Francesco Bartolomeo Rastrelli (1700 in Paris, Kingdom of France – 29 April 1771 in Saint Petersburg, Russian Empire) was an Italian architect who worked mainly in Russia. He developed an easily recognizable style of Late Baroque, both sumptuous and majestic. His major works, including the Winter Palace in Saint Petersburg and the Catherine Palace in Tsarskoye Selo, are famed for extravagant luxury and opulence of decoration.

Biography
Rastrelli was born in 1700 in Paris, where his father, Carlo Bartolomeo Rastrelli (1675–1744), a Florentine sculptor and architect who had trained in Rome, was active.  Nothing is known about Francesco's Parisian years, but it seems certain that the young man trained and worked in his father's workshop. In 1716, Bartolomeo moved to Saint Petersburg, which became a new Russian capital just a four years before, accompanying his father. His ambition was to combine the latest Italian architectural fashion with traditions of the Muscovite Baroque style. The first important commission came in 1721 when he was asked to build a palace for Prince Demetre Cantemir, former ruler of Moldavia.

He was appointed to the post of senior court architect in 1730. His works found favour with female monarchs of his time, and he retained this post throughout the reigns of Empresses Anna (1730–1740) and Elizabeth (1741–1762).

Rastrelli's last and most ambitious project was the Smolny Convent in St. Petersburg where Empress Elizabeth was to spend the rest of her life. The projected bell-tower was to become the tallest building in St Petersburg and all of Russia. Elizabeth's death in 1762 prevented Rastrelli from completing this grand design.

The new empress, Catherine II, dismissed Baroque architecture as an old-fashioned "whipped cream", and the aged architect retired to Courland, where he supervised the completion and decoration of the ducal palaces.

His last years were spent in obscure commerce with Italian art-dealers. He was elected to the Imperial Academy of Arts several months before his death.

Family 
He lived with his father and mother, and married Baroness Maria Anna von Walles, born in Berlin in 1710. She bore three children (one son and two daughters) according to the 1737 census.

While Rastrelli's son Giuseppe Iacopo died in December 1737 of cholera, and his daughter Eleonora died in January 1738, his daughter Elisabetta Caterina, born in 1734, married architect Francesco Bertogliati, his father's assistant.

Empress Elizabeth of Russia (1741–1761) 
Peter I's daughter was suspicious of all those who served the court of her predecessors. After going through all the architects in St. Petersburg, the Empress was convinced that Francesco Rastrelli is the best. Therefore, Francesco started serving to the Empress only in 1744.

In the period 1744–1760 he built all his famous buildings:

 Summer Palace (destroyed, built up by the Engineering Castle) 
 wooden Winter Palace on the Nevsky (destroyed, urban high-rise buildings) 
 stone Winter Palace (there is, the main building of the Hermitage Museum) 
 Smolny Cathedral and Monastery with four churches and cells 
 Palace for Chancellor Vorontsov (Vorontsov Palace in St. Petersburg, rebuilt as a military school) 
 Stroganov Palace, (it is a branch of the State Russian Museum now) 
 palace in Tsarskoe Selo (restored, Tsarskoe Selo (museum-reserve)) 
 completion and decoration of the interiors of Anichkov Palace in St. Petersburg.

Ten extant buildings by Rastrelli 

Boris Vipper has speculated that Rastrelli's last (and unfinished) design was for the Neoclassical Zaļenieki Manor near Mitava.

Demolished buildings

Posthumous glory 
Rastrelli is a cult figure of the Russian Baroque. His engravings with landscapes of Tsarskoe Selo were spread throughout Europe during Rastrelli's lifetime, and there are some examples in the collections of Ukraine and Germany.

 A bust of Rastrelli was installed in Tsarskoye Selo.
 The second bust of the famous architect was installed on St. Manege Square in St. Petersburg.
 A square in front of the Smolny Convent has borne Rastrelli's name since 1923. 
 In 1972, the documentary Architect Rastrelli was made (directed by Maria Kligman, Lennauchfilm, Russia).
 He is the subject of a composition, Rastrelli in Saint Petersburg, written in 2000 by Italian composer Lorenzo Ferrero.
 A quartet of Russian cellists, including Kirill Kravtsov, Mikhail Degtyarev, Kirill Timofeev, and Sergei Drabkin, is called Rastrelli. The quartet works in Germany and plays music from the Baroque to modern times.

References

External links 
 

Italian Baroque architects
Russian Baroque architects
Rococo architects
18th-century Italian architects
18th-century architects from the Russian Empire
Italian emigrants to the Russian Empire
1700 births
1771 deaths
Court of Elizabeth of Russia